Joseph Blackburn, also known as Jonathan Blackburn, (died 1787) was an English portrait painter who worked mainly in Bermuda and in colonial America. His notable works include portraits of Hugh Jones (circa 1777) and Colonel Theodore Atkinson (circa 1760).

Life and career
He seems to have been the son of a painter, and to have had a studio in Boston in 1750-1765; among his patrons were many important early American families, including the Apthorps, Amorys, Bulfinches, Lowells, Ewings, Saltonstalls, Winthrops, Winslows and Otises of Boston. Blackburn spent time in Bermuda (1752–1753), Newport (1754), Boston (1755–1758), and Portsmouth (1758–1762). In late 1763 he returned to London and painted portraits in southwestern England, Wales, and Dublin between 1768 and 1777. Approximately one hundred fifty of Blackburn's portraits survive. He excelled at painting textiles (i.e., representing the shimmer of silks, the texture of laces, and the folds of fabrics).

Some of his portraits are in the possession of the public library of Lexington, Massachusetts, and of the Massachusetts Historical Society, but most of them are privately owned and are scattered over the country, the majority being in Boston. One portrait, of Elizabeth Browne Rogers completed in 1761, is part of the permanent American art collection at Reynolda House Museum of American Art located in Winston-Salem, North Carolina.

John Singleton Copley was Blackburn's pupil, and it is said that he finally left his studio in Boston, through jealousy of Copley's superior success. His pictures were long attributed to Copley. 

"Now, thanks to evidence found within records held in our collections, we are able to confirm that Joseph Blackburn lived and died in the city of Worcester. He and his family lived in Broad Street in the parish of St. Nicholas. The exact date they moved there is unclear, but he certainly is a resident in 1768. They also leased properties around St. Martins Gate in the city, including The White Horse pub. Joseph inherited the lease for the properties after his father, Joseph Blackburn, gentleman, of Kinfare, (now Kinver), Staffordshire, and possibly his aunt, Henrietta Blackburn of Worcester died in 1759.

"The 1759 will of Henrietta mentions Joseph’s wife Mary and their two daughters, Henrietta and Elizabeth. His daughters both married local men: Henrietta to William Hill and Elizabeth to George Squire, but both women appear to have died without children. ..."

Art historian Lawrence Park authored, and the American Antiquarian Society published, the first biographical and critical study of Blackburn in 1923, restoring this long-overlooked artist to the attention of scholars and connoisseurs.

Dates of birth and death

There is a degree of confusion about the dates of birth and death of Blackburn. The most common suggestion for year of death is 1778 (see for instance the Encyclopædia Britannica and the  American Artists Bluebook) whereas Microsoft Encarta suggests 1774. 1730 is usually posited as the year of birth but it is at best an estimate.

Some sources still give 1700–1765 as Blackburn's years. These most likely derive from the 1911 Encyclopædia Britannica, published prior to Lawrence Park's review, "Joseph Blackburn – Portrait Painter", printed in the  Proceedings of the American Antiquarian Society in 1922, which established many of the known works of Blackburn.

In 2015 Worcestershire Archives announced that they had located details of Blackburn's burial in Worcester in 1787.

Artworks

Selected artworks

References

Attribution

External links
, which contains material on Joseph Blackburn (see index)
 

Year of birth uncertain
1787 deaths
18th-century English painters
English male painters
Artists from Boston
18th century in Boston
English portrait painters
American portrait painters
Painters from Massachusetts
18th-century English male artists